Among the effects of climate change on oceans are: an increase in sea surface temperature as well as ocean temperatures at greater depths, more frequent marine heatwaves, a reduction in pH value, a rise in sea level from ocean warming and ice sheet melting, sea ice decline in the Arctic, increased upper ocean stratification, reductions in oxygen levels, increased contrasts in salinity (salty areas becoming saltier and fresher areas becoming less salty), changes to ocean currents including a weakening of the Atlantic meridional overturning circulation, and stronger tropical cyclones and monsoons. All these changes have knock-on effects which disturb marine ecosystems. The primary factor causing these changes is the Earth warming due to human-caused emissions of greenhouse gases, such as carbon dioxide and methane. This leads inevitably to ocean warming, because the ocean is taking up most of the additional heat in the climate system. The ocean absorbs some of the extra carbon dioxide in the atmosphere, (via carbon sequestration), and this causes the pH value of the ocean to drop. It is estimated that the ocean absorbs about 25% of all human-caused  emissions.

Ocean temperature stratification increases as the ocean surface warms due to rising air temperatures.The decline in mixing of the ocean layers stabilises warm water near the surface while reducing cold, deep water circulation. The reduced up and down mixing reduces the ability of the ocean to absorb heat, directing a larger fraction of future warming toward the atmosphere and land. The amount of energy available for tropical cyclones and other storms is expected to increase, while nutrients for fish in the upper ocean layers are expected to decrease, as is the ocean's capacity to store carbon.

Warmer water cannot contain the same amount of oxygen as cold water. As a result, the gas exchange equilibrium shifts, lowering ocean oxygen levels while increasing oxygen in the atmosphere. Increased thermal stratification may result in a reduced supply of oxygen from surface waters to deeper waters, lowering the water's oxygen content further. The ocean has already lost oxygen throughout its water column, and oxygen minimum zones are expanding worldwide.

These changes harm marine ecosystems, which can accelerate species extinctions or cause population explosions, altering species distribution. This also affects coastal fishing and tourism. Rising water temperatures will also harm various oceanic ecosystems, such as coral reefs. The direct effect is coral bleaching on these reefs, which are sensitive to even minor temperature changes, so a small increase in temperature could have a significant impact in these environments. Ocean acidification and temperature rise will also affect the productivity and distribution of species within the ocean, threatening fisheries and upsetting marine ecosystems. Loss of sea ice habitats due to warming will severely impact the many polar species that rely on it. The interactions between many of these climate change factors increase pressures on the climate system and ocean ecosystems.

Changes due to rising greenhouse gas levels 

Presently (2020), atmospheric carbon dioxide (CO2) levels of more than 410 parts per million (ppm) are nearly 50% higher than preindustrial levels. These elevated levels and rapid growth rates are unprecedented in the geological record's 55 million years. The source for this excess  is clearly established as human-driven, reflecting a mix of anthropogenic fossil fuel, industrial, and land-use/land-change emissions. The idea that the ocean serves as a major sink for anthropogenic  has been discussed in scientific literature since at least the late 1950s. Several pieces of evidence point to the ocean absorbing roughly a quarter of total anthropogenic  emissions. 

The latest key findings about the observed changes and impacts from 2019 include:

Rising ocean temperature 

It is clear that the ocean is warming as a result of climate change, and this rate of warming is increasing. The global ocean was the warmest it had ever been recorded by humans in 2022. This is determined by the ocean heat content, which exceeded the previous 2021 maximum in 2022. The steady rise in ocean temperatures is an unavoidable result of the Earth's energy imbalance, which is primarily caused by rising levels of greenhouse gases.

The upper ocean (above 700 m) is warming the fastest, but the warming trend is widespread. The majority of ocean heat gain occurs in the Southern Ocean. For example, between the 1950s and the 1980s, the temperature of the Antarctic Southern Ocean rose by 0.17 °C (0.31 °F), nearly twice the rate of the global ocean. 

From 1960 to 2019, the average temperature of the upper 2000 meters of the ocean increased by 0.12°C, while the ocean surface temperature has warmed up to 1.2°C since the pre-industrial era. The warming rate varies with depth: at a depth of a thousand metres the warming occurs at a rate of nearly 0.4 °C per century (data from 1981 to 2019), whereas warming occurs at only half that depth.

Ocean heat content 
The Ocean temperature varies from place to place. Temperatures are higher near the equator and lower at the poles. As a result, changes in total ocean heat content best illustrate ocean warming. When compared to 1969–1993, heat uptake has increased between 1993 and 2017.

Reducing ocean pH value

Observed effects on the physical environment

Sea level rise 

Since around 1900, the global sea level has risen at an average rate of 1–2 mm/yr (the global average sea level was about 15–25 cm higher in 2018 compared to 1900). The rate of sea level rise is now increasing: from 2006 to 2018, sea level rose by about 4 mm per year.  

Many coastal cities will experience coastal flooding in the coming decades and beyond. Local subsidence, which may be natural but can be increased by human activity, can exacerbate coastal flooding. Coastal flooding will threaten hundreds of millions of people by 2050, particularly in Southeast Asia.

Changing ocean currents

Ocean currents are caused by temperature variations caused by sunlight and air temperatures at various latitudes, as well as prevailing winds and the different densities of salt and fresh water. Warm air rises near the equator. Later, as it moves toward the poles, it cools again. Cool air sinks near the poles,  but warms and rises again as it moves toward the equator. This produces Hadley cells, which are large-scale wind patterns, with similar effects driving a mid-latitude cell in each hemisphere. Wind patterns associated with these circulation cells drive surface currents which push the surface water to higher latitudes where the air is colder. This cools the water, causing it to become very dense in comparison to lower latitude waters, causing it to sink to the ocean floor, forming North Atlantic Deep Water (NADW) in the north and Antarctic Bottom Water (AABW) in the south.

Driven by this sinking and the upwelling that occurs in lower latitudes, as well as the driving force of the winds on surface water, the ocean currents act to circulate water throughout the sea. When global warming is factored in, changes occur, particularly in areas where deep water is formed. As the oceans warm and glaciers and polar ice caps melt, more and more fresh water is released into the high latitude regions where deep water forms, lowering the density of the surface water. As a result, the water sinks more slowly than it would normally.

The Atlantic Meridional Overturning Circulation (AMOC) has weakened since the preindustrial era, according to modern observations, climate simulations and paleoclimate reconstructions (the AMOC is part of a global thermohaline circulation). The most recent climate change projections for 2021 indicate that the AMOC is likely to weaken further over the course of the 21st century. A weakening of this magnitude could have a significant impact on global climate, with the North Atlantic being particularly vulnerable. This would have an impact in areas warmed by the North Atlantic drift, such as Scandinavia and Britain.  

Any changes in ocean currents affect the ocean's ability to absorb carbon dioxide (which is affected by water temperature) as well as ocean productivity because the currents transport nutrients (see Impacts on phytoplankton and net primary production). Because the AMOC deep ocean circulation is slow (it takes hundreds to thousands of years to circulate the entire ocean), it is slow to respond to climate change.

Increasing stratification 

Changes in ocean stratification are significant because they can influence productivity and oxygen levels. The separation of water into layers based on a specific quantity is known as stratification. Stratification by layers occurs in all ocean basins. The stratified layers act as a barrier to the water mixing, affecting the exchange of heat, carbon, oxygen and other nutrients. Since 1970, there has been an increase in stratification in the upper ocean due to global warming and, in some areas, salinity changes. The salinity changes are caused by evaporation in tropical waters, which results in higher salinity and density levels. Meanwhile, melting ice can cause a decrease in salinity at higher latitudes.

Water density is affected by temperature and salinity. As a result, the water column in the vast ocean basins is stratified, with less dense water near the surface and denser water deeper. This stratification is important not only in the formation of the Atlantic Meridional Overturning Circulation which has global weather and climate implications. It is also significant because stratification regulates nutrient transport from deep water to the surface. This contributes to ocean productivity and is linked to the compensatory downward flow of water that transports oxygen from the atmosphere and surface waters into the deep sea.   

The ocean's mid depth mix slowly with the surface waters, and the decay of sinking organic matter from primary production in these waters naturally results in low oxygen levels. Warming, on the other hand, reduces the amount of oxygen that dissolves in surface waters. Furthermore, increasing stratification isolates these mid-depth waters even more, resulting in lower oxygen levels (see also oxygen depletion section). The open ocean is losing oxygen, and this trend is expected to continue as a result of climate change, with overall oxygen levels dropping by several percent. This will have ecological consequences in areas where oxygen concentrations are low, though the overall biological consequences are minor.

Reduced oxygen levels 

The oxygen content of the ocean is vital for the survival of most larger animals and plants and also serves a long term role in controlling atmospheric oxygen upon which terrestrial life depends. Climate change affects ocean oxygen. There are two areas of concern in terms of ocean oxygen levels: The open ocean mid depth waters and the coastal waters. 

The first area of concern relates to the mid-depth waters of the open ocean, which are naturally low in oxygen. This is because these areas, known as oxygen minimum zones, are isolated from the atmosphere by sluggish ocean circulation, isolating these waters from the atmosphere (and hence oxygen) for decades, while sinking organic matter from surface waters is broken down consuming the available oxygen. These low oxygen ocean areas are expanding as a result of ocean warming which both reduces water circulation and also reduces the oxygen content of that water, while the solubility of oxygen declines as the temperature rises. 

Overall ocean oxygen concentrations are estimated to have declined 2% over 50 years from the 1960s. The nature of the ocean circulation means that in general these low oxygen regions are more pronounced in the Pacific Ocean. Low oxygen represents a stress for almost all marine animals. Very low oxygen levels create regions with much reduced fauna. It is predicted that these low oxygen zones will expand in future due to climate change, and this represents a serious threat to marine life in these oxygen minimum zones.   

The second area of concern relates to coastal waters where increasing nutrient supply from rivers to coastal areas leads to increasing production and sinking organic matter which in some coastal regions leads to extreme oxygen depletion, sometimes referred to as "dead zones". These dead zones are expanding driven particularly by increasing nutrient inputs, but also compounded by increasing ocean stratification driven by climate change.

Changes to Earth's weather system and wind patterns 

Climate change and the associated warming of the ocean will lead to widespread changes to the Earth's climate and weather system including increased tropical cyclone and monsoon intensities and weather extremes with some areas becoming wetter and others drier, therefore challenging current systems of agriculture. Changing wind patterns are predicted to increase wave heights in some areas. This can pose risks to mariners and also to marine structures.

Intensifying tropical cyclones 
Human-induced climate change "continues to warm the oceans which provide the memory of past accumulated effects". The result is a higher ocean heat content and higher sea surface temperatures. In turn, this "invigorates tropical cyclones to make them more intense, bigger, longer lasting and greatly increases their flooding rains". One example is Hurricane Harvey in 2017.

Salinity changes 

Due to global warming and increased glacier melt, thermohaline circulation patterns may be altered by increasing amounts of freshwater released into oceans and, therefore, changing ocean salinity. Thermohaline circulation is responsible for bringing up cold, nutrient-rich water from the depths of the ocean, a process known as upwelling.

Seawater consists of fresh water and salt, and the concentration of salt in seawater is called salinity. Salt does not evaporate, thus the precipitation and evaporation of freshwater influences salinity strongly. Changes in the water cycle are therefore strongly visible in surface salinity measurements, which has been known since the 1930s.

The long term observation records show a clear trend: the global salinity patterns are amplifying in this period. This means that the high saline regions have become more saline, and regions of low salinity have become less saline. The regions of high salinity are dominated by evaporation, and the increase in salinity shows that evaporation is increasing even more. The same goes for regions of low salinity that are becoming less saline, which indicates that precipitation is becoming more intensified.

Sea ice decline and changes 

Sea ice decline occurs more in the Arctic than in Antarctica, where it is more a matter of changing sea ice conditions.

Time scales 
Many of the ocean-related processes are "slow-responding elements of the climate system", namely the loss of ice (sea ice or glaciers), increase in ocean heat content, sea level rise and deep ocean acidification. They therefore represent a "millennial-scale commitment" (committed changes that are associated with past greenhouse gas emissions). The IPCC Sixth Assessment Report found that "The response of these variables depends on the time it takes to reach the global warming level, differs if the warming is reached in a transient warming state or after a temporary overshoot of the warming level, and will continue to evolve, over centuries to millennia, even after global warming has stabilized." Different global warming levels are for example 1.5 °C or 2 °C above the 1850–1900 period. 

This means that the impacts of climate change on the ocean will be slow to start but equally take a long time (centuries to millennia) to play out. For example, the "global mean sea level will continue to rise for thousands of years, even if future CO2 emissions are reduced to net zero and global warming halted". This is because excess energy due to past emissions will continue to extend into the deep ocean, and glaciers and ice sheets will continue to melt.

Impacts on marine life 
Climate change will not only alter the overall productivity of the ocean, but it will also alter the structure of the ocean's biomass community. In general, species are expected to move towards the poles as a result. Some species have already moved hundreds of kilometres since the 1950s. Phytoplankton bloom timings are also already altering moving earlier in the season particularly in polar waters. These trends are projected to intensify with further progress of climate change.

There are additional potentially important impacts of climate change on seabirds, fish and mammals in polar regions where populations with highly specialised survival strategies will need to adapt to major changes in habitat and food supply. In addition, sea ice often plays a key role in their life cycle. In the Arctic for example, providing haul-out sites for seals and walruses, and for hunting routes for polar bears. In the Antarctic, sea bird and penguin distributions are also believed to be very sensitive to climate change, although the impacts to date vary in different regions.

Impacts on oceanic calcifying organisms

Coral reefs and other shelf-sea ecosystems 

While some mobile marine species can migrate in response to climate change, others such as corals find this much more difficult. A coral reef is an underwater ecosystem characterized by reef-building corals. Reefs are formed by colonies of coral polyps held together by calcium carbonate. Coral reefs are important centres of biodiversity and vital to millions of people who rely on them for coastal protection, food and for sustaining tourism in many regions.

Warm water corals are clearly in decline, with losses of 50% over the last 30–50 years due to multiple threats from ocean warming, ocean acidification, pollution and physical damage from activities such as fishing. These pressures are expected to intensify. 

The warming ocean surface waters can lead to bleaching of the corals which can cause serious damage and/or coral death. The IPCC Sixth Assessment Report in 2022 found that: "Since the early 1980s, the frequency and severity of mass coral bleaching events have increased sharply worldwide". Coral reefs, as well as other shelf-sea ecosystems, such as rocky shores, kelp forests, seagrasses and mangroves have recently undergone mass mortalities from marine heatwaves. It is expected that many coral reefs will suffer irreversible changes and loss due to marine heatwaves with global temperatures increasing by more than 1.5 °C. 

Coral bleaching occurs when thermal stress from a warming ocean results in the expulsion of the symbiotic algae that resides within coral tissues. These symbiotic algae are the reason for the bright, vibrant colors of coral reefs. A 1-2°C sustained increase in seawater temperatures is sufficient for bleaching to occur, which turns corals white. If a coral is bleached for a prolonged period of time, death may result. In the Great Barrier Reef, before 1998 there were no such events. The first event happened in 1998 and after that, they begun to occur more frequently. Between 2016 - 2020 there were three of them.

Apart from coral bleaching, the reducing pH value in oceans is also a problem for coral reefs because ocean acidification reduces coralline algal biodiversity. The physiology of coralline algal calcification determines how the algae will respond to ocean acidification.

Ocean productivity 

The process of photosynthesis in the surface ocean releases oxygen and consumes carbon dioxide. This photosynthesis in the ocean is dominated by phytoplankton – microscopic free floating algae. After the plants grow, bacterial decomposition of the organic matter formed by photosynthesis in the ocean consumes oxygen and releases carbon dioxide. The sinking and bacterial decomposition of some organic matter in deep ocean water, at depths where the waters are out of contact with the atmosphere, leads to a reduction in oxygen concentrations and increase in carbon dioxide, carbonate and bicarbonate. This cycling of carbon dioxide in oceans is an important part of the global carbon cycle.  

The photosynthesis in surface waters consumes nutrients (e.g. nitrogen and phosphorus) and transfers these nutrients to deep water as the organic matter produced by photosynthesis sinks upon the death of the organisms. Productivity in surface waters therefore depends in part on the transfer of nutrients from deep water back to the surface by ocean mixing and currents. The increasing stratification of the oceans due to climate change therefore acts generally to reduce ocean productivity. However, in some areas, such as previously ice covered regions, productivity may increase. This trend is already observable and is projected to continue under current projected climate change. In the Indian Ocean for example, productivity is estimated to have declined over the past sixty years due to climate warming and is projected to continue.

A study that describes climate-driven trends in contemporary ocean productivity looked at global-ocean net primary production (NPP) changes detected from satellite measurements of ocean color from 1997 to 2006. These measurements can be used to quantify ocean productivity on a global scale and relate changes to environmental factors. They found an initial increase in NPP from 1997 to 1999 followed by a continuous decrease in productivity after 1999. These trends are propelled by the expansion of stratified low-latitude oceans and are closely linked to climate variability.

This declining trend in ocean productivity is expected to continue with productivity likely to decline by 4-11% by 2100 (for the high greenhouse gas emissions scenario of RCP 8.5). The decline will show regional variations. For example, the tropical ocean NPP will decline more: by 7–16% for the same emissions scenario. The flux of organic matter from the upper ocean into the ocean interior will decrease because of increased stratification and reduced nutrient supply. The reduction in ocean productivity is due to the "combined effects of warming, stratification, light, nutrients and predation".

Effects on fisheries 
The sustainable harvest of fish from the ocean depends on ocean productivity. As ocean productivity decreases, the potential maximum fish catch in countries' exclusive economic zones will also decrease. This catch is projected to decline globally, with different models predicting declines between 5 and 25% by the end of the century. Within this average global decline, declines in some regions such as the South Pacific are projected to be larger, and threaten the food security of local populations.

Harmful algal blooms 

Although the drivers of harmful algal blooms (HABs) are poorly understood, they appear to have increased in range and frequency in coastal areas since the 1980s. This is the result of human induced factors such as increased nutrient inputs (nutrient pollution) and climate change (in particular the warming of water temperatures). The parameters that affect the formation of HABs are ocean warming, marine heatwaves, oxygen loss, eutrophication and water pollution. These increases in HABs are of concern because of the impact of their occurrence on local food security, tourism and the economy.  

It is however also possible that the perceived global increase in HABs is simply due to better monitoring and more detrimental bloom impacts and not due to a climate-linked mechanism.

Spatially, all algal species (including those causing harmful algal blooms) may experience range expansion, contraction, or latitudinal shifts. Temporally, the seasonal windows of growth may expand or decrease.

Impacts on marine mammals 
Some effects on marine mammals, especially those in the Arctic, are very direct such as loss of habitat, temperature stress, and exposure to severe weather. Other effects are more indirect, such as changes in host pathogen associations, changes in body condition because of predator–prey interaction, changes in exposure to toxins and  emissions, and increased human interactions.  Despite the large potential impacts of ocean warming on marine mammals, the global vulnerability of marine mammals to global warming is still poorly understood.

Marine mammals have evolved to live in oceans, but climate change is affecting their natural habitat. Some species may not adapt fast enough, which might lead to their extinction.

It has been generally assumed that the Arctic marine mammals were the most vulnerable in the face of climate change given the substantial observed and projected decline in Arctic sea ice. However, research has shown that the North Pacific Ocean, the Greenland Sea and the Barents Sea host the species that are most vulnerable to global warming. The North Pacific has already been identified as a hotspot for human threats for marine mammals and is now also a hotspot for vulnerability to global warming. Marine mammals in this region will face double jeopardy from both human activities (e.g., marine traffic, pollution and offshore oil and gas development) and global warming, with potential additive or synergetic effects. As a result, these ecosystems face irreversible consequences for marine ecosystem functioning.

Marine organisms usually tend to encounter relatively stable temperatures compared to terrestrial species and thus are likely to be more sensitive to temperature change than terrestrial organisms. Therefore, the ocean warming will lead to the migration of increased species, as endangered species look for a more suitable habitat. If sea temperatures continue to rise, then some fauna may move to cooler water and some range-edge species may disappear from regional waters or experience a reduced global range. Change in the abundance of some species will alter the food resources available to marine mammals, which then results in marine mammals' biogeographic shifts. Furthermore, if a species is unable to successfully migrate to a suitable environment, it will be at risk of extinction if it cannot adapt to rising temperatures of the ocean.

Arctic sea ice decline leads to loss of the sea ice habitat, elevations of water and air temperature, and increased occurrence of severe weather. The loss of sea ice habitat will reduce the abundance of seal prey for marine mammals, particularly polar bears. Sea ice changes may also have indirect effects on animal heath due to changes in the transmission of pathogens, impacts on animals' body condition due to shifts in the prey-based food web, and increased exposure to toxicants as a result of increased human habitation in the Arctic habitat.

Sea level rise is also important when assessing the impacts of global warming on marine mammals, since it affects coastal environments that marine mammal species rely on.

Example marine mammals

Polar bears

Seals 

Seals are another marine mammal that are susceptible to climate change. Much like polar bears, some seal species have evolved to rely on sea ice. They use the ice platforms for breeding and raising young seal pups. In 2010 and 2011, sea ice in the Northwest Atlantic was at or near an all-time low and harp seals as well as ringed seals that bred on thin ice saw increased death rates. Antarctic fur seals in South Georgia in the South Atlantic Ocean saw extreme reductions over a 20-year study, during which scientists measured increased sea surface temperature anomalies.

Dolphins 
Dolphins are marine mammals with broad geographic extent, making them susceptible to climate change in various ways. The most common effect of climate change on dolphins is the increasing water temperatures across the globe. This has caused a large variety of dolphin species to experience range shifts, in which the species move from their typical geographic region to cooler waters. Another side effect of increasing water temperatures is the increase in harmful algae blooms, which has caused a mass die-off of bottlenose dolphins. 

Climate change has had a significant impact on various dolphin species. For example: In the Mediterranean, increased sea surface temperatures, salinity, upwelling intensity, and sea levels have led to a reduction in prey resources, causing a steep decline in the short-beaked common dolphin subpopulation in the Mediterranean, which was classified as endangered in 2003. At the Shark Bay World Heritage Area in Western Australia, the local population of the Indo-Pacific bottlenose dolphin had a significant decline following a marine heatwave in 2011. River dolphins are highly affected by climate change as high evaporation rates, increased water temperatures, decreased precipitation, and increased acidification occur.

Potential feedback effects

Methane release from methane clathrate 
Rising ocean temperatures also have the potential to impact methane clathrate reservoirs located under the ocean floor sediments. These trap large amounts of the greenhouse gas methane, which ocean warming has the potential to release. However, it is currently considered unlikely that gas clathrates (mostly methane) in subsea clathrates will lead to a "detectable departure from the emissions trajectory during this century".

In 2004 the global inventory of ocean methane clathrates was estimated to occupy between one and five million cubic kilometres.

Prevention 

The methods to prevent or reduce further effects of climate change on oceans involve global-scale reduction in greenhouse gas emissions (climate change mitigation), as well as regional and local mitigation and management strategies moving forward.

See also
 Blue carbon
 Carbon sequestration
 Effects of climate change on island nations
 Effects of climate change on the water cycle
 Special Report on the Ocean and Cryosphere in a Changing Climate (2019)
 Sustainable fisheries

Notes

References

External links

 IPCC Working Group I (WG I). Intergovernmental Panel on Climate Change group which assesses the physical scientific aspects of the climate system and climate change.
 Climate from the World Meteorological Organization
 Climate change UN Department of Economic and Social Affairs Sustainable Development
 Effects of climate change from the Met Office
 United Nations Environment Programme and climate change
 FAO - Fisheries and Aquaculture

Effects of climate change
Oceans